Edward William Barankin (1920 – 1985) was an American mathematician and statistician.

He received his A.B. from Princeton University in 1941 and his Ph.D. in mathematics from the University of California, Berkeley in 1946. For the academic year 1946–1947 he was Hermann Weyl's assistant at the Institute for Advanced Study. At U. C. Berkeley he was a professor of mathematics from 1947 to 1955 and a professor of statistics from 1955 to 1985.

Upon his death, Edward W. Barankin was survived by his former wife, Claire Barankin Wasser, two sons, Joseph Paul Barankin and Barry Alexander Barankin, and two grandsons, Nathan Robert Barankin and Micha David Barankin.  His granddaughter, Elizabeth Alexandra Meghan Barankin, was born a year and a half after his death.

References

1920 births
1985 deaths
American statisticians
Princeton University alumni
UC Berkeley College of Letters and Science alumni
University of California, Berkeley College of Letters and Science faculty
Mathematicians from Pennsylvania